Fotheringay is a historic plantation home located near Elliston, Montgomery County, Virginia.  The house was built about 1796, and is a two-story, five bay brick dwelling with a hipped roof and deep two-story rear ell. It features a projecting two-level provincial type portico.  The house was originally built as a three bay dwelling with the portico on the southernmost bay.  It was expanded to the full five bays in the 1950s.  It was the home of Col. George Hancock (1754–1820).

It was listed on the National Register of Historic Places in 1969.

References

External links
Fotheringay, U.S. Route 11 vicinity, Elliston, Montgomery County, VA: 3 photos and 2 data pages at Historic American Buildings Survey

Historic American Buildings Survey in Virginia
Plantations in Virginia
Houses on the National Register of Historic Places in Virginia
Houses completed in 1796
Houses in Montgomery County, Virginia
National Register of Historic Places in Montgomery County, Virginia
Elliston, Virginia
1796 establishments in Virginia